The Kalininsko-Solntsevskaya line (Line 8) is a line of the Moscow Metro, currently consisting of two separate parts. It was opened as the eastwards Kalininskaya line in 1979, with the first stations of the western Solntsevsky radius opening in 2014. Presently there are 8 stations on the eastern section and 14 on the western section. The two parts are planned to be joined after 2023. To distinguish the 2 sections, the newer west section is identified as Line 8A.

History
The line's pilot stage, which would see it extending from Taganskaya through Lefortovo and into the eastern districts of Perovo, Novogireevo and Veshnyaki, was opened for the 1980 Moscow Olympics. The line bears all traits of the late 1970s architecture and engineering. No longer pressed for economy designs and aesthetics, the architects were given full freedom to use advanced materials.

The engineers were able to introduce new designs, particularly for the Column stations of Marksistskaya and Aviamotornaya which were built without ventral crosspieces, allowing a huge economy in time by abandoning the use of tubings. The shallow column station of Novogireevo further demonstrated its parting with previous centipede roots by increasing inter-column width from six to seven and a half metres.

What makes the line unique is its name, as it was originally named after partially passing the Kalinin District, which disappeared in the 1990s. Thus, the line is the only in Moscow which carries the name of a figurehead, Mikhail Kalinin, rather than the area it serves.

In 1986, the line's first extension opened, with the station Tretyakovskaya, the third cross-platform transfer in Moscow Metro was set up this way. It was planned for the line to continue and link up with the Arbatskaya station of the Arbatsko-Pokrovskaya line, allowing it to be split and the old route Aleksandrovsky Sad—Ploshchad Revolyutsii route to be reused, whilst the Kalininskaya line, now operating to Kievskaya would extend southwestwards.

This was not to be realised, and the western extension plans stalled for more than two decades due to the financial instability of the 1990s and other priorities.

With the opening of the Bolshaya Koltsevaya line, the route changed to include the new stations and the temporary but indefinite closure of Delovoy Tsentr. On February 24, Delovoy Tsentr on the Kalininsko-Solntsevskaya line closed, while on February 26, Delovoy Tsentr on the Bolshaya Koltsevaya line opened. Trains from Ramenki now continue north onto the Bolshaya Koltsevaya line at Shelepikha to Petrovsky Park.

The original route of the line through Delovoy Tsentr reflected the fact that the Solntsevskaya branch does not have an active rail yard. Trains would shift from that station to the Arbatsko-Pokrovskaya line and onward to the Izmailovo yard. As the Bolshaya Koltsevaya line uses the Izmailovo yard, trains can operate along the new route to Petrovsky Park and onward to the yard. In the meantime, there is no timeline for Delovoy Tsentr to reopen. However, it could be several years as completion of the central branch of the line to Tretyakovskaya has not yet begun.

Timeline

Stations

Rolling stock

The line is served by the Novogireevo depot (№ 12). 36 eight-carriage trains of the newest 81-760/761 model are running on the line. It was also served by one new 81-717.6K/714.6K eight-carriage train in 2007–2011 and by two 81-717.5M/714.5M in 2009–2011, but the most trains till 2012 were old 81-717/714, built between 1979 and 1983. In 2012–2013 all 81-717/714 trains were replaced by new 81-760/761 (called "Oka") trains. The last 81-717/714 train emerged on the line in April 2013.

Subway car types used on the line over the years:

Series 81-717: 1979 — 2013

Series 81-717.5M: 2009 — 2011

Series 81-717.6К: 2009 — 2011

Series 81-760/761: April 2012 — present

Series 81-765.3/766.3/767.3: 2018 — present

Series 81-765.4/766.4/767.4: 2019 — present

Recent developments and future plans

The line currently exists as a single radial, but for a long time an extension through the city centre and then on westwards has been planned.

Perovsky radial
Novokosino was completed in 2012. There is a connection linking the Aviamotornaya Kalininskaya line station to Aviamotornaya on the Nekrasovskaya line.

Solntsevsky radial
It is not yet connected to the rest of Kalininskaya line.

A future possible extension will take the line toward Vnukovo International Airport. Any such an extension would come after 2023.
{
  "type": "FeatureCollection",
  "features": [
    {
      "type": "Feature",
      "properties": {},
      "geometry": {
        "type": "LineString",
        "coordinates": [
          [
            37.32845306396485,
            55.63288979526256
          ],
          [
            37.32845306396485,
            55.63288979526256
          ],
          [
            37.30424880981446,
            55.61888499879606
          ],
          [
            37.30424880981446,
            55.61888499879606
          ],
          [
            37.29000091552735,
            55.605844895190735
          ],
          [
            37.29000091552735,
            55.605844895190735
          ]
        ]
      }
    }
  ]
}

City center
The gap between Delovoy Tsentr and Tretyakovskaya is planned to be connected via the city center after 2023.
{
  "type": "FeatureCollection",
  "features": [
    {
      "type": "Feature",
      "properties": {},
      "geometry": {
        "type": "LineString",
        "coordinates": [
          [
            37.54201322793961,
            55.74970183297682
          ],
          [
            37.54201322793961,
            55.74970183297682
          ],
          [
            37.56794214248658,
            55.75186549196401
          ],
          [
            37.56794214248658,
            55.75186549196401
          ],
          [
            37.580763101577766,
            55.74581902024308
          ],
          [
            37.580763101577766,
            55.74581902024308
          ],
          [
            37.60359406471253,
            55.74487694219753
          ],
          [
            37.60359406471253,
            55.74487694219753
          ],
          [
            37.61378109455109,
            55.74284374777852
          ],
          [
            37.61378109455109,
            55.74284374777852
          ]
        ]
      }
    }
  ]
}

The planned stations on this route are (from east to west):
 Volkhonka (with a transfer to Kropotkinskaya on the Sokolnicheskaya line)
 Plyushchikha (with a transfer to Smolenskaya on the Arbatsko-Pokrovskaya line)
 Dorogomilovskaya (with a possibility of constructing a new transfer station at Koltsevaya line)

References

External links

Kalininskaya & Solntsevskaya lines photos & info on the Robert Schwandl's UrbanRail site
Kalininskaya & Solntsevskaya lines gallery on the Urban Electric Transit

Moscow Metro lines
Railway lines opened in 1979